Ginger in the Morning is a 1974 comedy-drama-romance film starring Sissy Spacek as a hitchhiker. It was only the third theatrical film for Spacek, and the first American film appearance of Fred Ward.

The film was later released on home video by Troma Entertainment.

Plot
Joe, a middle-aged executive driving home from the airport, still smarting from a recent divorce, picks up Ginger, a much younger, pretty hitchhiker with a guitar and a suitcase full of poetry books.  Ginger speaks her mind and has a tender, joyful spirit.  She is going to Colorado Springs, so Joe pretends he's going to Denver, when he actually lives in Santa Fe.  When they need a place to stop over that night, they cannot find a motel room.  Joe drives to his house, but pretends it belongs to a friend who is out of town and offered to let Joe use the house.  

Joe is clearly taken with Ginger and she finds Joe is willing, if clumsily, to sing and run with her and listen to ideas for a better life.  Joe's little white lies soon fall apart as Ginger gives him a foot bath and chest rub to recover from a chill.  No matter.  The two have fallen for each other.

It looks to be a very romantic night until Joe's best buddy and wild man Charlie shows up unexpectedly.  In his raucous jesting, unaware that Ginger is listening from upstairs, Charlie frames Joe as someone just looking for a hot night with a pretty babe.  Ginger's trust in Joe is shattered.  She wants to leave for the bus station right then and there.  Joe is in despair and cannot express his underlying sincerity to Ginger.   But Charlie is a good man at heart, sees the harm he's done, and convinces a reluctant Ginger to at least stay the night.  Joe cannot find his way to a productive course of action and instead, in retribution, recruits Charlie's ex-wife Sugar to come over and make Charlie's night a nightmare.

The four characters go out for dinner, where alcohol and latent fury between Charlie and Sugar result in ejection from the restaurant and near arrest of the two men.  Things don't improve back at Joe's house, where Ginger reveals she is pregnant with a former boyfriend's child, and the two women leave to stay at a hotel.   Joe and Charlie drive to the mountains where Joe wrestles with the idea of making a commitment to Ginger and her unborn child.  All four eventually end up back at Joe's house, where Joe still cannot break through his crisis of non-commitment. Ginger declares it's over and leaves for the bus station.  

In the final scenes of the movie, Joe becomes alarmed at his missed opportunity, and gets the town sheriff to chase and stop the bus Ginger is on.  Once on the bus, Joe cannot convince Ginger to reconsider, so he gets back off and the bus pulls away.  But the movie has a final little surprise.

Cast

See also
 List of American films of 1974

References

External links
 
 
 
 
 Ginger in the Morning at the Troma Entertainment movie database

1974 films
1974 comedy-drama films
American comedy-drama films
1970s English-language films
1970s American films